Achill Island in County Mayo is the largest of the Irish isles, and is situated off the west coast of Ireland. It has a population of 2,594. Achill is attached to the mainland by Michael Davitt Bridge, between the villages of Achill Sound and Polranny. A bridge was first completed here in 1887. Other centres of population include the villages of Keel, Dooagh, Dooega, Dooniver, and Dugort. The parish's main Gaelic football pitch and secondary school are on the mainland at Polranny. Early human settlements are believed to have been established on Achill around 3000 BC.
The island is 87% peat bog. The parish of Achill consists of Achill Island, Achillbeg, Inishbiggle and the Corraun Peninsula.

Roughly half of the island, including the villages of Achill Sound and Bunacurry are in the Gaeltacht (traditional Irish-speaking region) of Ireland, although the vast majority of the island's population speaks English as their daily language.

History
It is believed that at the end of the Neolithic Period (around 4000 BC), Achill had a population of 500–1,000 people. The island would have been mostly forest until the Neolithic people began crop cultivation. Settlement increased during the Iron Age, and the dispersal of small promontory forts around the coast indicate the warlike nature of the times. Megalithic tombs and forts can be seen at Slievemore, along the Atlantic Drive and on Achillbeg.

Overlords
Achill Island lies in the Barony of Burrishoole, in the territory of ancient Umhall (Umhall Uactarach and Umhall Ioctarach), that originally encompassed an area extending from the County Galway/Mayo border to Achill Head.

The hereditary chieftains of Umhall were the O'Malleys, recorded in the area in 814 AD when they successfully repelled an onslaught by the Vikings in Clew Bay. The Anglo-Norman invasion of Connacht in 1235 AD saw the territory of Umhall taken over by the Butlers and later by the de Burgos. The Butler Lordship of Burrishoole continued into the late 14th century when Thomas le Botiller was recorded as being in possession of Akkyll and Owyll.

Immigration
In the 17th and 18th centuries, there was much migration to Achill from other parts of Ireland, particularly Ulster, due to the political and religious turmoil of the time. For a while, there were two different dialects of Irish being spoken on Achill. This led to many townlands being recorded as having two names during the 1824 Ordnance Survey, and some maps today give different names for the same place. Achill Irish still has many traces of Ulster Irish.

In the nineteenth and early twentieth centuries, seasonal migration of farm workers to Scotland to pick potatoes took place; these squads of 'tattie howkers' were known as Achill workers, although not all were from Achill, and were organised for potato merchants by gaffers or gangers. Squads travelled from farm to farm to harvest the crop and were allocated basic accommodation. On 15 September 1937 ten young migrant potato pickers from Achill died in a fire at Kirkintilloch.

Specific historical sites and events

Grace O'Malley's Castle
Carrickkildavnet Castle is a 15th-century tower house associated with the O'Malley Clan, who were once a ruling family of Achill. Grace O' Malley, or Granuaile, the most famous of the O'Malleys, was born on Clare Island around 1530. Her father was the chieftain of the barony of Murrisk. The O'Malleys were a powerful seafaring family, who traded widely. Grace became a fearless leader and gained fame as a sea captain and pirate. She is reputed to have met with Queen Elizabeth I in 1593. She died around 1603 and is buried in the O'Malley family tomb on Clare Island.

Achill Mission

One of Achill's most famous historical sites is that of the Achill Mission or 'the Colony' at Dugort. In 1831, the Anglican (Church of Ireland) Rev Edward Nangle founded a mission at Dugort. The Mission included schools, cottages, an orphanage, an infirmary and a guesthouse. 

The Colony gave rise to mixed assessments, particularly during the Great Famine when charges of "souperism" were leveled against Nangle. The provision of food across the Achill Mission schools - which also provided 'scriptural' religious instruction - was particularly controversial. 

For almost forty years, Nangle edited a newspaper called the Achill Missionary Herald and Western Witness, which was printed in Achill. He expanded his mission into Mweelin, Kilgeever, West Achill where a school, church, rectory, cottages and a training school were built. Edward's wife, Eliza, suffered poor health in Achill and died in 1852; she is buried with six of the Nangle children on the slopes of Slievemore in North Achill. 

In 1848, at the height of the Great Famine, the Achill Mission published a prospectus seeking to raise funds for the acquisition of significant additional lands from Sir Richard O'Donnell. The document gives an overview, from the Mission's perspective, of its activities in Achill over the previous decade and a half including considerable sectarian unrest. In 1851, Edward Nangle confirmed the purchase of the land which made the Achill Mission the largest landowner on the island. 

The Achill Mission began to decline slowly after Nangle was moved from Achill and closed in the 1880s. When Edward Nangle died in 1883 there were opposing views on his legacy.

Railway
In 1894, the Westport – Newport railway line was extended to Achill Sound. The railway station is now a hostel. The train provided a great service to Achill, but it also is said to have fulfilled an ancient prophecy. Brian Rua O' Cearbhain had prophesied that 'carts on iron wheels' would carry bodies into Achill on their first and last journey. In 1894, the first train on the Achill railway carried the bodies of victims of the Clew Bay Drowning. This tragedy occurred when a boat overturned in Clew Bay, drowning thirty-two young people. They had been going to meet the steamer which would take them to Scotland for potato picking.

The Kirkintilloch Fire in 1937 almost fulfilled the second part of the prophecy when the bodies of ten victims were carried by rail to Achill. While it was not literally the last train, the railway closed just two weeks later. These people had died in a fire in a bothy in Kirkintilloch. This term referred to the temporary accommodation provided for those who went to Scotland to pick potatoes, a migratory pattern that had been established in the early nineteenth century.

Kildamhnait
Kildamhnait on the south-east coast of Achill is named after St. Damhnait, or Dymphna, who founded a church there in the 7th century. There is also a holy well just outside the graveyard. The present church was built in the 1700s and the graveyard contains memorials to the victims of two of Achill's greatest tragedies, the Kirchintilloch Fire (1937) and the Clew Bay Drowning (1894).

The Monastery
In 1852, Dr John MacHale, Roman Catholic Archbishop of Tuam, purchased land in Bunnacurry, on which a Franciscan Monastery was established, which, for many years, provided an education for local children. The building of the monastery was marked by a conflict between the Protestants of the mission colony and the workers building the monastery. The dispute is known in the island folklore as the Battle of the Stones. 

A notable monk who lived at the monastery for almost thirty years was Brother Paul Carney. He wrote a biography of James Lynchehaun who rose to either fame or infamy (depending on whom you spoke to) following his conviction for the 1894 attack on an Englishwoman named Agnes MacDonnell, which left her face disfigured, and the burning of her home, Valley House, Tonatanvally, North Achill. (The home was rebuilt and Mrs MacDonnell died there in 1923, while Lynchehaun escaped to the USA after serving 7 years and successfully resisted extradition but spent his last years in Scotland, where he died.) Brother Carney's-great grandniece, Patricia Byrne, write her own account of Mrs MacDonnell and Lynchehaun, entitled The Veiled Woman of Achill.

Brother Carney also wrote accounts of his lengthy fundraising trips across the U.S. at the start of the 20th century. The ruins of this monastery are still to be seen in Bunnacurry today.

Valley House
The historic Valley House is located in Tonatanvally, "The Valley", near Dugort, in the northeast of Achill Island. The present building sits on the site of a hunting lodge built by the Earl of Cavan in the 19th century. Its notoriety arises from an incident in 1894 in which the then owner, an Englishwoman, Mrs Agnes McDonnell, was savagely beaten and the house set alight by a local man, James Lynchehaun. Lynchehaun had been employed by McDonnell as her land agent, but the two fell out and he was sacked and told to quit his accommodation on her estate. A lengthy legal battle ensued, with Lynchehaun refusing to leave. At the time, in the 1890s, the issue of land ownership in Ireland was politically charged. After the events at the Valley House in 1895, Lynchehaun would falsely claim his actions were carried out on behalf of the Irish Republican Brotherhood and motivated by politics. He escaped custody after serving seven years and fled to the United States seeking political asylum (although Michael Davitt refused to shake his hand, calling Lynchehaun a "murderer"), where he successfully defeated legal attempts by the British authorities to have him extradited to face charges arising from the attack and the burning of the Valley House. Agnes McDonnell suffered terrible injuries from the attack but survived and lived for another 23 years, dying in 1923. Lynchehaun is said to have returned to Achill on two occasions, once in disguise as an American tourist, and eventually died in Girvan, Scotland, in 1937. The Valley House is now a hostel and bar.

The Deserted Village
Close by Dugort, at the base of Slievemore mountain lies the Deserted Village. There are approximately 80 ruined houses in the village. The houses were built of unmortared stone, which means that no cement or mortar was used to hold the stones together. Each house consisted of just one room and this room was used as a kitchen, living room, bedroom and even a stable. If one looks at the fields around the Deserted Village and right up the mountain, one can see the tracks in the fields of 'lazy beds', which is the way crops like potatoes were grown. In Achill, as in many areas of Ireland, a system called 'Rundale' was used for farming. This meant that the land around a village was rented from a landlord. This land was then shared by all the villagers to graze their cattle and sheep. Each family would then have two or three small pieces of land scattered about the village, which they used to grow crops. For many years people lived in the village and then in 1845 Famine struck in Achill as it did in the rest of Ireland. Most of the families moved to the nearby village of Dooagh, which is beside the sea, while some others emigrated. Living beside the sea meant that fish and shellfish could be used for food. The village was completely abandoned which is where the name 'Deserted Village' came from.

No one has lived in these houses since the time of the Famine, however, the families that moved to Dooagh and their descendants, continued to use the village as a 'booley village'. This means that during the summer season, the younger members of the family, teenage boys and girls, would take the cattle to graze on the hillside and they would stay in the houses of the Deserted Village. This custom continued until the 1940s. Boolying was also carried out in other areas of Achill, including Annagh on Croaghaun mountain and in Curraun. At Ailt, Kildownet, the remains of a similar deserted village can be found. This village was deserted in 1855 when the tenants were evicted by the local landlord so the land could be used for cattle grazing; the tenants were forced to rent holdings in Currane, Dooega and Slievemore. Others emigrated to America.

Archaeology

Recent archaeological research suggests the village was occupied year-round at least as early as the 19th century, though it is known to have served as a seasonally occupied 'booley village' by the first half of the 20th century. A booley village (a number of which exist in a ruined state on the island) is a village occupied only during part of the year, such as a resort community, a lake community, or (as the case on Achill) a place to live while tending flocks or herds of ruminants during winter or summer pasturing. Specifically, some of the people of Dooagh and Pollagh would migrate in the summer to Slievemore and then go back to Dooagh in the autumn. The summer 2009 field school excavated Round House 2 on Slievemore Mountain under the direction of archaeologist Stuart Rathbone.  Only the outside north wall, entrance way and inside of the Round House were completely excavated.

From 2004 to 2006, the Achill Island Maritime Archaeology Project directed by Chuck Meide was sponsored by the College of William and Mary, the Institute of Maritime History, the Achill Folklife Centre (now the Achill Archaeology Centre), and the Lighthouse Archaeological Maritime Program (LAMP). This project focused on the documentation of archaeological resources related to Achill's rich maritime heritage.  Maritime archaeologists recorded a 19th-century fishing station, an ice house, boat house ruins, a number of anchors which had been salvaged from the sea, 19th-century and more recent currach pens, a number of traditional vernacular watercraft including a possibly 100-year-old Achill yawl, and the remains of four historic shipwrecks.

Other places of interest

The cliffs of Croaghaun on the western end of the island are the third highest sea cliffs in Europe but are inaccessible by road. Near the westernmost point of Achill, Achill Head, is Keem Bay. Keel Beach is quite popular with tourists and some locals as a surfing location. South of Keem beach is Moytoge Head, which with its rounded appearance drops dramatically down to the ocean. An old British observation post, built during World War I to prevent the Germans from landing arms for the Irish Republican Army, is still standing on Moytoge. During the Second World War this post was rebuilt by the Irish Defence Forces as a lookout post for the Coast Watching Service wing of the Defence Forces. It operated from 1939 to 1945.

The mountain of Slievemore, (672 m) rises dramatically in the north of the island and the Atlantic Drive (along the south/west of the island) has some scenic views. On the slopes of Slievemore, there is an abandoned village, the "Deserted Village", traditionally thought to be a remnant village from An Gorta Mór (The Great Hunger of 1845–1849). Just west of the deserted village is an old Martello tower, again built by the British to warn of any possible French invasion during the Napoleonic Wars. The area also boasts an approximately 5000-year-old Neolithic tomb.

Achillbeg (Little Achill) is a small island just off Achill's southern tip. Its inhabitants were resettled on Achill in the 1960s. A plaque to Johnny Kilbane is situated on Achillbeg and was erected to celebrate 100 years since his first championship win. 

The villages of Dooniver and Askill have picturesque scenery and the cycle route is popular with tourists.

Caisleán Ghráinne, also known as Kildownet Castle, is a small tower house built in the early 1400s. It is located in Cloughmore, on the south of Achill Island. It is noted for its associations with Grace O'Malley, along with the larger Rockfleet Castle in Newport.

Economy
While a number of attempts at setting up small industrial units on the island have been made, its economy is largely dependent on tourism. Subventions from Achill people working abroad allowed many families to remain living in Achill throughout the 19th and 20th centuries. In the past, fishing was a significant activity but this aspect of the economy is small now. At one stage, the island was known for its shark fishing, basking shark in particular was fished for its valuable shark liver oil. There was a big spurt of growth in tourism in the 1960s and 1970s before which life was tough and difficult on the island. Despite healthy visitor numbers each year, the common perception is that tourism in Achill has been slowly declining since its heyday. Currently, the largest employers on Achill are two hotels.

Religion
Most people on Achill are either Roman Catholic or Anglican (Church of Ireland).

Overview of the churches
 Catholic:
Bunnacurry Church (Saint Josephs)
 The Valley Church; Only open for certain events.
 Dookinella Church
 Currane Church
 Pollagh Church
 Derreens Church
 Dooega Church
 Belfarsed Church
 Achill Sound Church
 Church of Ireland:
 Dugort Church (St. Thomas's church)
 Innisbiggle Island church
 Other:
 House of Prayer, Achill

Artists 
For almost two centuries, a number of artists have had a close relationship with Achill Island, including the landscape painter Paul Henry. Within the emerging Irish Free State, Paul Henry's landscapes from Achill and other areas reinforced a vision of Ireland of communities living in harmony with the land. He lived in Achill for almost a decade with his wife, artist Grace Henry and, while using similar subject-matter, the pair developed very different styles.

This relationship of artists with Achill was particularly intense in the early decades of the twentieth century when Eva O'Flaherty (1874-1963) became a focal point for artistic networking on the island. A network of over 200 artists linked to Achill is charted in "Achill Painters - An Island History" and includes painters such as the Belgian Marie Howet, the American Robert Henri, the modernist painter Mainie Jellett and contemporary artist Camille Souter.

The 2018 Coming Home Art & The Great Hunger exhibition, in partnership with The Great Hunger Museum of Quinnipiac University, USA, featured Achill's Deserted Village and the island lazy beds prominently in works by Geraldine O'Reilly and Alanna O'Kelly; also included was an 1873 painting, 'Cottage, Achill Island' by Alexander Williams - one of the first artists to open up the island to a wider audience.

Education
Hedge schools existed in most villages of Achill in various periods of history. A university was started by the missions to Achill in Mweelin. In the modern age, there used to be two secondary schools in Achill, Mc Hale College and Scoil Damhnait. However, in August 2011, the two schools amalgamated to form Coláiste Pobail Acla. For primary education, there are eight national schools including Bullsmouth NS, Valley NS, Bunnacurry NS, Dookinella NS, Dooagh NS, Saula NS, Achill Sound NS and Tonragee NS. National schools closed down include Dooega NS, Crumpaun NS, Ashleam NS and Currane NS.

Transport

Rail
Achill railway station, still on the mainland and not on the island, was opened by the Midland Great Western Railway on 13 May 1895, the terminus of its line from Westport via Newport and Mulranny. The station, and the line, were closed by the Great Southern Railways on 1 October 1937. The Great Western Greenway, created during 2010 and 2011, follows the line's route and has proved to be very successful in attracting visitors to Achill and the surrounding areas.

Bus
Bus Éireann's route 450 operates several times daily to Westport and Louisburgh from the island's scattered villages. Bus Éireann also provides transport for the area's secondary school children.

Taxi
There are several taxicab and hackney carriage services on the island.

Cuisine
Achill Island has several bars, cafes and restaurants. The island's Atlantic location means that seafood, including lobster, mussels, salmon, trout and winkles, are common meals. With a large sheep and cow populations, lamb and beef are popular on the island too.

Sport
Achill has a Gaelic football club which competes in the junior championship and division 1E of the Mayo League. There are also Achill Rovers which play in the Mayo Association Football League.

There is a 9-hole links golf course on the island. Outdoor activities can be done through Achill Outdoor Education Centre. Achill Island's rugged landscape and the surrounding ocean offers multiple locations for outdoor adventure activities, like surfing, kite-surfing and sea kayaking. Fishing and watersports are also common. Sailing regattas featuring a local vessel type, the Achill Yawl, have been popular since the 19th century, though most present-day yawls, unlike their traditional working boat ancestors, have been structurally modified to promote greater speed under sail. The island's waters and underwater sites are occasionally visited by scuba divers, though Achill's unpredictable weather generally has precluded a commercially successful recreational diving industry.

Population
In 2016, the population was 2,594, with 5.2% claiming they spoke the Irish on a daily basis outside the education system.  The island's population has declined from around 6,000 before the Great Famine of the mid-19th century.

Demographics 
The table below reports data on Achill Island's population taken from Discover the Islands of Ireland (Alex Ritsema, Collins Press, 1999) and the census of Ireland.

Architecture

Few inhabited houses date from before the 20th century, though there are many examples of abandoned stone structures dating to the 19th century.

The best known of these earlier can be seen in the "Deserted Village" ruins near the graveyard at the foot of Slievemore. Even the houses in this village represent a relatively comfortable class of dwelling as, even as recently as a hundred years ago, some people still used "Beehive" style houses (small circular single-roomed dwellings with a hole in the ceiling to let out smoke).

Many of the oldest inhabited cottages date from the activities of the Congested Districts Board for Ireland—a body set up around the turn of the 20th century in Ireland to improve the welfare of the inhabitants of small villages and towns. Most of the homes in Achill at the time were very small and tightly packed together in villages. The CDB subsidised the building of new, more spacious (though still small by modern standards) homes outside of the traditional villages.

Notable people

 Heinrich Böll, German writer who spent several summers with his family and later lived several months per year on the island
 Charles Boycott (1832–1897), unpopular landowner from whom the term boycott arose
 Nancy Corrigan, pioneer aviator, second female commercial pilot in the US.
 Dermot Freyer (1883–1970), writer who opened a hotel on the island
 Paul Henry, artist, stayed on the island for a number of years in the early 1900s
 James Kilbane, singer, lives on the island
 Johnny Kilbane, boxer
 Saoirse McHugh, former Green Party politician
 Danny McNamara, musician
 Richard McNamara, musician
 Eva O’Flaherty, Nationalist, model and milliner
 Thomas Patten, from Dooega. Died during the Siege of Madrid in December 1936
 Honor Tracy, author, lived there until her death in 1989

Literature

Heinrich Böll: Irisches Tagebuch, Berlin, 1957
Bob Kingston The Deserted Village at Slievemore, Castlebar, 1990
Theresa McDonald: Achill: 5000 B.C. to 1900 A.D.: Archeology History Folklore, I.A.S. Publications [1992]
Rosa Meehan: The Story of Mayo, Castlebar, 2003
James Carney: The Playboy & the Yellow lady, 1986 Poolbeg
Hugo Hamilton: The Island of Talking, 2007
Kevin Barry: Beatlebone, 2015
Mealla Nī Ghiobúin: Dugort, Achill Island 1831–1861: The Rise and Fall of a Missionary Community, 2001
Patricia Byrne: The Veiled Woman of Achill – Island Outrage & A Playboy Drama, 2012
Mary J. Murphy: Achill's Eva O'Flaherty – Forgotten Island Heroine, 2011
Patricia Byrne: The Preacher and The Prelate – The Achill Mission Colony and The Battle for Souls in Famine Ireland, 2018
Mary J. Murphy, Achill Painters -An Island History, 2020
Michael Gallagher, Stick on Stone, 2013

In popular culture
The island is featured throughout the film The Banshees of Inisherin in various locations on the island including Keem Bay, Cloughmore, and Purteen Pier.

The island is the primary setting of the visual novel If Found....

See also
 Achillbeg
 Innisbiggle
 List of islands of County Mayo

References

External links

 Colaiste Pobail Acla students project on the Achill area
 Achill Island Maritime Archaeology Project
 VisitAchill multilingual visitor's site

 
Islands of County Mayo
Gaeltacht places in County Mayo